64 and 66 Low Petergate is a grade II* listed building, in the city centre of York, in England.

The building lies on Low Petergate, which has long been one of the major streets in York city centre.  The oldest part of the building is the south-east wing, which dates from the 15th century.  This was part of a house which was owned by the Talbot family in the 16th century, and they added a two-storey structure on the north-east side of the wing, which has been reduced over time to a small, single-storey section.  In the 17th century, the neighbouring 62 Low Petergate became the Talbot Inn, one of the main coaching inns in the city, and it may have extended into what is now 64 and 66 Low Petergate.  The 15th-century walls were mostly rebuilt, and a new staircase was added, now known as the Talbot Stairs, and a new wing was added to the north-west.  All this section of the building is timber-framed, and has been heavily restored.

In 1743, the front of the building was rebuilt.  The new front was three storeys high, and five bays wide.  The upper floor windows survive, as does the top of a drainpipe, dated 1743, two fireplaces, a door, and two staircases.  The ground floor has been replaced with 20th-century plate glass shopfronts.

In the 20th century, the building formed part of the York College for Girls.  This closed in 1997, and the building was restored in 2007.  The front part of its ground floor serves as two shops, while the upper floors are residential.

References

Low Petergate 64-66
Low Petergate 64-66
Buildings and structures completed in 1743
Timber framed buildings in Yorkshire